Marcus Daniel Cronin (9 January 1865 – 12 August 1936) was a United States military officer. He served in a number of conflicts, including the Spanish–American War, Philippine–American War and World War I.

Early life and education 
Cronin was born in Worcester, Massachusetts on 9 January 1865. He attended College of the Holy Cross, then began attendance at the United States Military Academy, from which he graduated in 1887; his classmates included future Major General George O. Squier, and his attendance was concurrent with that of future generals John Pershing and Peyton March. Later, Cronin attended the Army War College and graduated in 1911.

Military career 
On 12 January 1887, Cronin was commissioned as a second lieutenant of the infantry and served on the United States frontier from 1887–1893. After his frontier duty, Cronin became an instructor at West Point from 1893–1897. With the outbreak of the Spanish–American War, Cronin became regimental adjutant of the 25th Infantry and served in the Santiago Campaign of 1898; during his time in Cuba, Cronin was also a member of the Sanitary Corps. In the subsequent Philippine–American War, Cronin served as colonel of the United States Volunteers and later became assistant chief of the Philippine Constabulary from 1915–1917. Following the United States' entry into World War I, Cronin was promoted to brigadier general of the National Army on 5 August 1917. He became commander of the 163rd Infantry Brigade at Camp Gordon, serving in France as part of the American Expeditionary Force. Cronin later retired in 1925.

Personal life and death 
Cronin married Helen Hannay on 2 August 1893. He lived in La Jolla, California, and later died in Governors Island, New York, on 12 August 1936. He was buried at San Francisco National Cemetery.

References 

United States Army generals of World War I
United States Military Academy alumni
1865 births
1936 deaths
People from Worcester, Massachusetts
United States Army War College alumni
American military personnel of the Spanish–American War
American military personnel of the Philippine–American War
United States Army generals
United States Military Academy faculty
Burials at San Francisco National Cemetery
Military personnel from Massachusetts
United States Army Infantry Branch personnel